Adriane Johnson is an American politician and attorney serving as a member of the Illinois Senate from the 30th district. Johnson assumed office on October 11, 2020, succeeding Terry Link. The 30th district includes all or part of the municipalities of Beach Park, Buffalo Grove, Green Oaks, Lincolnshire, Mundelein, North Chicago, Riverwoods, Wheeling, Vernon Hills and Waukegan.

Education 
Johnson earned a Bachelor of Liberal Studies from Columbia College Chicago and a Master of Jurisprudence in business law from the Loyola University Chicago School of Law.

Career 
Following her education, she joined the Illinois Association of Park Districts' (IAPD) Board of Trustees in 2015 and served two years as vice chair and one year as chair-elect.

She was appointed to the Illinois Senate on October 11, 2020, succeeding Terry Link. Johnson is the first African-American state senator to represent Lake County, Illinois. She has continued to serve on the Buffalo Grove Park Board following her appointment until the end of her board term.

As of July 2022, Senator Johnson is a member of the following Illinois Senate committees:

 Appropriations - Agriculture, Environment & Energy Committee (SAPP-SAAE)
 Appropriations - Human Services Committee (SAPP-SAHS)
 Behavioral and Mental Health Committee (SBMH)
 Commerce Committee (SCOM)
 Environment and Conservation Committee (SNVR)
 Ethics Committee (SETH)
 Public Safety Committee (SPUB)
 Redistricting - Lake & McHenry Counties (SRED-SRLM)
 Transportation Committee (STRN)

Personal life 
Johnson and her husband, Bruce, have one daughter and live in Buffalo Grove, Illinois.

References 

Living people
Columbia College Chicago alumni
Loyola University Chicago School of Law alumni
Democratic Party Illinois state senators
People from Buffalo Grove, Illinois
People from Lake County, Illinois
Women state legislators in Illinois
African-American state legislators in Illinois
African-American women in politics
21st-century American politicians
21st-century American women politicians
Year of birth missing (living people)
21st-century African-American women
21st-century African-American politicians